Netsky may refer to
Netsky (computer worm)
Hankus Netsky, American klezmer musician
Netsky (musician) (born 1989), stage name of Boris Daenen, Belgian musician
Netsky (album), the musician's self-titled album